Eynon Hawkins (26 June 1920 – 17 December 2001) was an Albert Medal and George Cross World War II hero and a Welsh rugby union and rugby league footballer who played in the 1940s and 1950s.

Early life
The son of a miner, Eynon Hawkins was born in Llanharan, in Glamorgan. His birth was registered in Bridgend district. Educated locally, he left school at 14 and went into the mining industry working in Llanharan Powell Duffryn colliery, playing rugby union for Llanharan RFC, Bridgend RFC and Glamorgan County RFC in his spare time. He joined the navy in 1940, and, after training at HMS Raleigh and HMS Drake, he spent nine months on a trawler patrolling the English Channel, before transferring as a seaman gunner to the defensively armed merchant ship (Dems), with whom he served in the Atlantic, Mediterranean and Indian oceans.

War experience
On 11 January 1943 Eynon was a Royal Navy able-seaman serving as a gunner aboard the British Tanker Company's MV British Dominion, one of a 14-strong convoy en route to Malta from the West Indies.

The blaze was so fierce and the fear of explosion so great that, before the lifeboats could be launched, the order was given for the crew to abandon ship.

Many crew members jumped overboard. In the terrible confusion that followed, Hawkins, with great coolness and courage, managed to gather together a group of about nine men and keep them clear of the burning oil. He twice swam away from his companions to go to the assistance of other survivors who were in difficulty, encouraging them and swimming back with them to the group. The burning oil was still spreading and, as one of the Royal Navy escorts began to pick up survivors, Hawkins, still helping to pull his companions to safety, was badly burned on the face.

For his great courage in saving life at sea, Hawkins was awarded the Albert medal in bronze, which he received from King George VI at Buckingham Palace on 16 November 1943. He later also received the Lloyds medal for bravery at sea.

Rugby career
Hawkins won 6-caps for Wales between 1949, and 1953 while at Salford and the Rochdale Hornets.

References

External links
Past Players → G & H at bridgendravens.co.uk
Statistics at bridgendravens.co.uk

1920 births
2001 deaths
Bridgend RFC players
Glamorgan County RFC players
Llanharan RFC players
Recipients of the Albert Medal (lifesaving)
Rochdale Hornets players
Rugby league players from Rhondda Cynon Taf
Rugby league props
Rugby union players from Llanharan
Salford Red Devils players
Wales national rugby league team players
Welsh rugby league players
Welsh rugby union players